is a former Japanese football player.

Playing career
Shimmyo was born in Chiba Prefecture on July 16, 1972. After graduating from high school, he joined Japan Soccer League club Toshiba (later Consadole Sapporo) in 1991. In 1992, Japan Soccer League was folded and the club joined new league Japan Football League (JFL). He played many matches as offensive midfielder from 1992. However his opportunity to play decreased in 1996. In 1997, he moved to JFL club Ventforet Kofu. He played many matches and the club was promoted to new league J2 League from 1999. Although he played many matches, the club finished at bottom place for 2 years in a row (1999-2000). He retired end of 2000 season.

Club statistics

References

External links

1972 births
Living people
Association football people from Chiba Prefecture
Japanese footballers
Japan Soccer League players
J2 League players
Japan Football League (1992–1998) players
Hokkaido Consadole Sapporo players
Ventforet Kofu players
Association football midfielders